The Diocese of Meath is a diocese of the Catholic Church that is located in the middle part of Ireland. It is one of eight suffragan dioceses of the ecclesiastical province of Armagh. Thomas Deenihan has been bishop of the diocese since 2 September 2018.

Geography
Meath diocese covers most of counties Meath and Westmeath, part of Offaly along with part of counties Longford, Louth, Dublin and Cavan. The principal towns are Ashbourne, Drogheda, Dunboyne, Laytown-Bettystown-Mornington,  Kells, Mullingar, Navan and Tullamore.

Ecclesiastical history

Early history
Although there had been abbot-bishops of Clonard since the sixth century, the diocese of Clonard proper was not formally established until 1111.  It was one of the twenty-four dioceses established by the Synod of Rathbreasail. The diocese covered roughly the western part of the Kingdom of Meath with the bishop's seat located at Clonard Abbey.

Lordship of Ireland
During the twelfth century the bishops of Clonard acquired most of Meath as their territory, and frequently used the title "bishop of Meath" or "bishop of the men of Meath". After Bishop Simon Rochfort transferred his seat from Clonard to Trim in 1202, the normal style became the "Bishop of Meath". From 1778 until the late 19th century it had its seat in Navan, County Meath.

19th and 20th centuries
Charles Stewart Parnell's relationship with Mrs Katharine O'Shea led to the Bishop of Meath having a letter read at masses in the diocese in condemnation of the relationship. As Parnell was popular, this caused a backlash which eventually led to the cathedral removing to Mullingar, County Westmeath permanently. The diocesan school, St. Finian's College also moved to Mullingar from Navan.

The diocesan cathedral is Christ the King Cathedral, Mullingar, situated near the town centre.

Ordinaries

The following is a basic list of bishops of Meath since 1830:

 John Cantwell (1830–1866)
 Thomas McNulty (1866–1898)
 Mathew Gaffney (1899–1906)
 Laurence Gaughran (1906–1928)
 Thomas Mulvany (1929–1943)
 John Francis D'Alton (1943–1946)
 John Anthony Kyne (1947–1966)
 John McCormack (1968–1990)
 Michael Smith (1990–2018)
 Thomas Deenihan (18 June 2018 – present)

Vicars General
The serving Vicars general as of 2020 are Declan Hurley, administrator of Navan parish and Joseph Gallagher, Parish priest of Tullamore.

See also
 Catholic Church in Ireland
 The Diocese of Meath - a publication on the history of the diocese
Diocese of Meath and Kildare (Church of Ireland)

References

External links
Official website for the diocese
Diocese of Meath (GCatholic.org)
Catholic-Hierarchy.org - Diocese Profile

 
552 establishments
6th-century establishments in Ireland
Dioceses established in the 6th century
Religion in County Meath
Religion in County Offaly
Religion in County Longford
Religion in County Louth
Religion in County Westmeath
Roman Catholic Ecclesiastical Province of Armagh